Fragmentation or fragmented may refer to:

Computers
 Fragmentation (computing), a phenomenon of computer storage
 File system fragmentation, the tendency of a file system to lay out the contents of files non-continuously
 Fragmented distribution attack, in computer security
 IP fragmentation, a process in computer networking

Science
 Fragmentation (cell biology), in cells
 Fragmentation (reproduction), a form of asexual reproduction
 Fragmentation of memory, a psychological disorder
 Fragmentation (mass spectrometry), a technique to study structure of molecules
 Fragmentation (weaponry), a feature of explosive weaponry
 Fragmentation (medicine), an operation that breaks of solid matter in a body part into pieces, such as kidney stones
 Fragmentation, the quantification by photoanalysis of blasted material
 Hadronization, with quarks

Other
 Fragmentation (economics), a process of globalization
 Fragmentation (music), a compositional technique
 Fragmentation (sociology), a term used in urban sociology
 Feudal fragmentation, in European history
 Habitat fragmentation, in an organism's preferred environment
 Market fragmentation, the existence of multiple incompatible technologies in a single market segment
 Population fragmentation, a form of population segregation
 Fragmented (album), a 2006 album by band Up Dharma Down
 Fragmentation function, a probability function

See also
 Divergence
 Fragment (disambiguation)
 Separation (disambiguation)